Arcthoplites is an extinct genus of cephalopod belonging to the ammonite subclass.

References

Early Cretaceous ammonites of North America
Albian life
Albian genus extinctions
Hoplitidae
Ammonitida genera